This is the discography of Blitzen Trapper, an American rock band, centered in Portland, Oregon.  Blitzen Trapper has released records steadily since 2003, and is known for their brand of folk/countrypolitan rock infused with pop sensibilities, and a variety of styles and influences including country funk, Americana, and psychedelia.  Prior to forming Blitzen Trapper, the band toured under the name Garmonbozia and self-released eight non-commercial albums under that name.  The lineup of Blitzen Trapper has remained almost unchanged over the entirety of their studio and live albums, with the exception of former member Drew Laughery, who departed the band prior to 2011's American Goldwing.

Blitzen Trapper's most commercially successful period occurred between 2008's Furr and 2011's American Goldwing, during which time the band's studio albums appeared on the Billboard 200.  However, their move from label SubPop to Vagrant Records in 2013 preceded their first charting single on a Billboard chart: "Thirsty Man," from the album VII, which went to #29 on the Adult Alternative Songs chart.

Overall, Blitzen Trapper's discography consists of ten studio albums, two live albums, three extended plays, seven singles and thirteen music videos.

Albums

Studio albums

Live albums

Extended plays

References

Blitzen Trapper albums
Discographies of American artists